The 1971 Maghreb Athletics Championships was the fifth edition of the international athletics competition between the countries of the Maghreb. Algeria, Tunisia and Morocco were the competing nations. Organised by the Union des Fédérations d'Athlétisme du Maghreb Uni (Union of Athletics Federations of the United Maghreb), it took place on 27 February in Casablanca, Morocco. It was the second Moroccan city to host the event, after the capital Rabat in 1967. A total of 36 athletics events were contested, 22 for men and 14 for women.

It was the last time that the competition was held on a yearly schedule, with the event becoming a biennial one instead. Morocco topped the medal table courtesy of its complete sweep of the women's titles. Tunisia took second with twelve golds in the men's section, followed by Algeria with five men's golds. Tunisia's performance was led by Mansour Guettaya and Mohamed Gammoudi, who won a middle-distance running and long-distance running double, respectively. In the women's events, Chérifa Meskaoui was the most successful with four individual gold medals, in hurdles, shot put, discus throw, and pentathlon.

Medal summary

Men

Women

References

Champions
Les championnats maghrebins d athletisme. Union Sportive Oudja. Retrieved on 2015-02-20.

Maghreb Athletics Championships
International athletics competitions hosted by Morocco
Sport in Casablanca
Maghreb Athletics Championships
Maghreb Athletics Championships
20th century in Casablanca